The Cherry Ridge Shale is a geologic formation in Pennsylvania. It preserves fossils dating back to the Devonian period.

See also

 List of fossiliferous stratigraphic units in Pennsylvania
 Paleontology in Pennsylvania

References
 

Devonian geology of Pennsylvania